Law and Lawless is a 1932 American pre-Code western film directed by Armand Schaefer and starring Jack Hoxie, Julian Rivero, and Yakima Canutt. It was released on November 30, 1932, by Majestic Pictures.

Synopsis
Gunfighter Montana and his sidekick, Gonzales, find that a ranch foreman is behind a series of cattle rustlings. They are put in jail for an alleged shooting, but they escape, find the foreman again, and make him take them to his boss.

Cast

 Jack Hoxie as Montana
 Hilda Moreno as Rosita Lopez
 Julian Rivero as Pancho Gonzales
 Yakima Canutt as Tex Barnes
 Jack Mower as Don Roberto Lopez
 Hal Taliaferro as Buck Daggett (credited as Wally Wales)
 Frank Glendon (credited as J. Frank Glendon)
 Edith Fellows as Betty Kelly
 Bob Burns as Mr. Kelley
 Helen Gibson as Molly
 Al Taylor as Steve - Foreman (uncredited)
 William Quinn as Pete (uncredited)

References

External links
 

1932 Western (genre) films
1932 films
American Western (genre) films
Majestic Pictures films
American black-and-white films
Films directed by Armand Schaefer
1930s American films
1930s English-language films